Will Weaver (born William Weller; 1950 in Park Rapids, Minnesota), is an American author.

Background
Weaver was raised on a dairy farm near Park Rapids, Minnesota, where his parents, who were of Scandinavian descent, farmed 150 acres. In Weaver's youth, he enjoyed fishing and participating in sports (he was the captain of his high school basketball team). At 16 years of age, he once finished second in a demolition derby. One of three children, he attended the local country school. Weaver attended Saint Cloud State University, 1968–69; University of Minnesota, B.A., 1972; Stanford University, M.A., 1979.

Career
His debut was Red Earth, White Earth, about a native Minnesotan returning to his home town due to conflicts between white farmers and local Native Americans. It was made into a CBS-TV movie in 1989. His 1989 short story collection, A Gravestone Made of Wheat and Other Stories, won many awards, including the Minnesota Book Award for Fiction. The title story was produced in 2006 as the independent feature film Sweet Land, featuring Ned Beatty.

Weaver has also written many stories for young adults, including the Billy Baggs baseball novels. These include Striking Out, Farm Team, and Hard Ball. He has also written Memory Boy, Claws, Full Service, and Defect. Saturday Night Dirt, the first of a series on dirt-racers, was released in 2008 followed by Super Stock Rookie. He is the winner of both the McKnight Foundation and the Bush Foundation  prizes for fiction.

In addition to writing, Weaver became a creative-writing teacher at Bemidji State University in Bemidji, Minnesota, he has since retired from teaching. He resides in the Bemidji area with his wife Rose, who is formerly a professor at Bemidji State, and his teenage children.  In April 2014, he recorded an interview with Peter Shea in which he talked about his life and work.

Bibliography

Novels and novellas
 The Survivors (2013)
 Checkered Flag Cheater (2010)
 Super Stock Rookie (2009)
 Saturday Night Dirt (2008)
 Defect (2007)
 Full Service (2005)
 Claws (2003)
 Memory Boy (2001)
 Hard Ball (1998)
 Farm Team (1995)
 Striking Out (1993)
 Red Earth, White Earth (1986)

Short story collections
 Sweet Land (2006)
 A Gravestone Made of Wheat and Other Stories (1989)
 WWJD

Nonfiction
 Barns of Minnesota (with Doug Ohman) (2005)

References

External links
Will Weaver Official Website.

1950 births
Living people
People from Park Rapids, Minnesota
American people of Scandinavian descent
Stanford University alumni
University of Minnesota alumni
St. Cloud State University alumni
American male writers
Writers from Minnesota